was a professional Go player.  (His surname is occasionally given as Segoshi, but that appears to be a misreading, even if attested by furigana in some books he authored.)

Biography 
Segoe had Go Seigen, Utaro Hashimoto, and Cho Hunhyun as pupils. He also authored numerous books, such as his Tesuji Dictionary (with Go Seigen) and Go proverbs Illustrated. An internal quarrel in the Nihon Ki-in led to his becoming an isolated, if very much respected, figure. His participation in competition post-1945 was quite low.

He committed suicide on July 27, 1972, shortly after his pupil Cho Hun-hyun returned to South Korea for military service.

References 

1889 births
1972 suicides
Japanese Go players
Go (game) writers
Suicides in Japan